This is a list of seasons completed by the Detroit Pistons of the National Basketball Association. The franchise was founded in 1941 as the Fort Wayne Zollner Pistons in the National Basketball League and as the Fort Wayne Pistons joined the Basketball Association of America, which was the precursor to the NBA. However, the games won and lost in the NBL are not included in the franchise total.

The Pistons have had three main periods of success. In the early years of the NBA the team reached the NBA Finals twice in consecutive years before falling to the Lakers and then to the St. Louis Hawks. Following an extended era of mediocrity the Pistons, led by the Hall of Fame backcourt of Isiah Thomas and Joe Dumars and nicknamed the "Bad Boys" for their intimidating defence, posted winning records every seasons from 1983–84 to 1991–92, and after narrowly losing in 1988, ended the Lakers dynasty of the 1980s the following season and repeated the following year. The Pistons’ third period of success, with former on-court star Dumars serving as general manager and building a top team from other franchises’ discards, occurred between 2001–02 and 2007–08 when the team won fifty games or more during every season, including a third NBA title in 2003–04 and a franchise record total of wins two seasons later.

The Pistons have experienced two major periods of failure. Since 2009–10, the Pistons have only once finished out of the bottom two in their division or had a winning record.

Seasons

All-time records

NBA records

NBL records

References

 
seasons